Sebastián Andrés Fassi Álvarez (born May 19, 1993) is a Mexican professional footballer who plays as a goalkeeper for Spanish Primera Federación club San Fernando CD.

References

External links

Living people
1993 births
Mexican footballers
Mexican expatriate footballers
Association football goalkeepers
Footballers from Mexico City
C.F. Pachuca players
Belén F.C. players
Guayaquil City F.C. footballers
Tlaxcala F.C. players
Club Necaxa footballers
Club León footballers
Mineros de Zacatecas players
Atenas de San Carlos players
San Fernando CD players
Ascenso MX players
Liga Premier de México players
Tercera División de México players
Mexican expatriate sportspeople in Costa Rica
Mexican expatriate sportspeople in Ecuador
Mexican expatriate sportspeople in Uruguay
Mexican expatriate sportspeople in Spain
Expatriate footballers in Costa Rica
Expatriate footballers in Ecuador
Expatriate footballers in Uruguay
Expatriate footballers in Spain